The Haryana women's cricket team is a women's cricket team that represents the Indian state of Haryana. The team competes in the Women's Senior One Day Trophy and the Women's Senior T20 Trophy.

See also
 Haryana cricket team

References

Women's cricket teams in India
Cricket in Haryana
Women's sports in Haryana